The NECOBELAC Project is a network of collaboration between Europe, Latin American and Caribbean (LAC) countries to spread know-how in scientific writing and provide the best tools to exploit open access information for the safeguard of public health.

The main goal of the project is to promote scientific writing and open access publication models through training sessions involving people working in public health and develop a network to discuss and continuing the work done before.

Project Summary
This project aims to increase the know-how in the production, dissemination, retrieval, and use of health information in Latin American and Caribbean (LAC) countries, using the European and LAC experiences in fields like scientific writing and open access (OA) to scientific publication using institutional repositories and new publication OA models. For the other side, the project intends to create a network of institutions closely collaborating in training programs and that could maintain in the future the network between all the participants and stakeholders. The countries involved will benefit from contacts with experts in the field of scientific writing and open access development and will be able to share their experiences and knowledge with others partners promoting and increasing the network. This results in mutual advantages: Europe will be able to benefit by increased access to the research outputs of Latin American and Caribbean countries (LAC) and by the wider adoption of open access methods; LAC countries will be able to benefit from sharing quality programs in launching and operating open access initiatives and strengthen their existing networks and collections in the health sciences including the Virtual Health Library and Scientific Electronic Library Online - SciELO.

Project Goals
The overall goals of the NECOBELAC project are:
 Improve scientific writing;
 Promote open access publication models;
 Foster technical and scientific cooperation between Europe and Latin American Caribbean (LAC) countries.
NECOBELAC works in cooperation with professional associations supporting scientific writing, such as the European Association of Science Editors and Mediterranean Editors and Translators, and those supporting open access publishing

Project management
The project management  is divided in seven work packages (WP) where each partner is responsible for their work. The project is coordinated by the Istituto Superiore di Sanità (ISS) that does the project management (WP1) and  the project strategy and impact assessment (WP2). The previous WP aims to define strategies to implement the European LAC network and the knowledge transference and consensus between all the participants.
The University of Nottingham manages the WP3 - Cross-national advocacy infrastructure. This WP intends to develop an infrastructure that allows the communication and support to NECOBELAC community. In communication strategy it uses the know-how of large experience on advocacy projects and materials, such as RSP, SHERPA and OpenDOAR. NECOBELAC Project website  is the infrastructure that provides advice, information and materials to stakeholders in different countries.
The WP4 - Training activities is responsible to organize training activities. The main goal is to create a web modular system and the production of learning materials to support NECOBELAC trainers. It is developed by the Consejo Superior de Investigaciones Científicas (CSIC)in cooperation with the other project partners.
The Universidade do Minho promotes the project infrastructure to guarantee its usage in Europe-LAC countries - WP5. For this, the Portuguese experience on RCAAP initiative is relevant to share knowledge, disseminate the project and increase the NECOBELAC network.
The WP6 - Networking LAC-Europe countries aims to promote, improve and strengthen networking between European and Latin-American and Caribbean countries. The WP6 is produced by Centro LatinoAmericano e do Caribe de Informação em Ciencias da Saude (BIREME). BIREME/PAHO/WHO promotes the creation, dissemination, and adoption of best practices and common standards to produce reliable open access scientific and technical information in health.
The Universidad Nacional de Colombia is the leader of the WP7 - Focus on health-related structures in LAC countries and involves the aggregation among health-related structures in LAC countries to increase the impact of the project.

Training Courses
The project has two-level training activity:
 Training for trainers (T1 courses);
 Training for local participants (T2 courses).
This training is supported by the use of conceptual maps about scientific publication and open access

NECOBELAC Project FAQ's
One list of questions  was developed to help more easily understand how the project is working. This booklet is available in four languages and is divided into three groups:
 training activities;
 topic maps;
 collaboration to develop the network.

References

External links
Official website 

Collaborative projects
Open access projects